, nicknamed "Kaz", is a Japanese game designer and professional racing driver. He is CEO of Polyphony Digital and producer of the Gran Turismo video game series.

Polyphony Digital
He became the president of Polyphony Digital after designing his first game Motor Toon Grand Prix, a cartoon-inspired racing title similar to Mario Kart.  Motor Toon Grand Prix later spawned a sequel, Motor Toon Grand Prix 2, which was the only game in the franchise released outside Japan. Since then, Yamauchi has fulfilled his dream  of creating realistic driving simulators with his massively successful Gran Turismo series. He has also expressed interest in broadening out to other game genres; in 1999 Polyphony Digital released Omega Boost, a shoot 'em up title set in space, which has since proven to be Yamauchi's only foray outside of racing game development.

As a result of Gran Turismo's success, Yamauchi has become an important figure in the worldwide automotive industry. Polyphony Digital worked with Nissan to design the multifunction display (which relays various pieces of car data to the driver, including G-Force generated, torque distribution and lap times) found in the R35 GT-R. The car, as well as the display itself, appear in many games in his franchise, Gran Turismo 5 Prologue, Gran Turismo 5,  Gran Turismo 6 and a newer, facelifted version of the car in Gran Turismo Sport and Gran Turismo 7. He was given a Nissan GT-R for his contribution. 

On a video included with Gran Turismo 5 Prologue, Yamauchi remarked his favorite car design is the Ford GT and he owns two in real life.

A documentary focusing on Gran Turismo and Yamauchi called Kaz: Pushing the Virtual Divide, was released on January 22, 2014 on Hulu.

Racing career
On August 29, 2009, he joined the World Car Awards team participating the SP8 class in race 8 of VLN piloting a Lexus IS-F on the Nürburgring. He clocked a fastest lap of 10 minutes 9 seconds which is the best in the team, and their team recorded a class win. He returned to the Nürburgring track as one of the 4 drivers of Team World Car Award participating in the 24 Hours of Nürburgring 2010 and finished in 4th place in SP8 class.

Kazunori Yamauchi also competed as one of the four drivers of the #96 Spoon Sports FD2 Honda Civic Type R during the 25 Hours of Thunderhill in 2009, which was his first time driving in a US road course. Their race was plagued by penalties such as having to modify the exhaust tip for exceeding noise regulations and a penalty for improper fueling, which forced the team to spend almost an hour in the pits. The car itself didn't have any problems though, and placed 7th out of 17 cars in its class, and 23rd overall out of 66 cars, after completing 617 laps.

Yamauchi took part in the 2011 24 Hours of Nürburgring as one of the four drivers of the #71 Schulze Motorsport Nissan GT-R N24. The team finished the race in 36th place overall, achieving a victory in the SP8T class after overcoming several technical problems, and beating competition from drivers including Johnny Herbert and Mark Blundell.

For the 2012 24 Hours of Nürburgring, Yamauchi returned to Nissan, driving the #123 GT-R with Lucas Ordóñez. He finished 1st in the SP8T class, and 30th overall, though the SP8T class that year only consisted of two cars, both of them were Nissan GT-Rs.

Yamauchi joined the SP9 class for the 2013 24 Hours of Nürburgring, driving Schulze Motorsport's Nissan GT-R Nismo GT3. Although the team managed to lead the first qualifying session overall for over 40 minutes, multiple reliability problems in the race put them down to 165th place overall at one point, but the team managed to recover to 135th position overall at the checkered flag.

For the 2014 24 Hours of Nürburgring, Yamauchi again drove Schulze Motorsport's Nissan GT-R Nismo GT3 with Jordan Tresson, Tobias and Michael Schulze. The team managed to have a much cleaner race than in 2013, and impressively finished 14th overall out of 165 cars.

The 2016 Nürburgring 24 Hour race saw Yamauchi make the switch from Nissan to BMW, where he piloted the #101 Walkenhorst Motorsport M6 GT3, and finished 22nd overall.

Racing record

25 Hours of Thunderhill results

24 Hours of Nürburgring results

Honors
In 2013, Yamauchi had a street named in honor of him in the city of Ronda. Named "Paseo de Kazunori Yamauchi", the street snakes around the Parador de Ronda. According to Ronda's city mayor Maria de la Paz Fernandez Lobato, "There is no doubt that his work has a huge cultural resonance with people today. He has driven the racing game genre to new levels of realism and his creations are as much art as technology. Ronda’s association with Gran Turismo is also a reflection that our ancient city is a modern, vibrant place to live and very much part of the 21st century."

In 2015, Yamauchi was awarded the "Grand Prize of Creativity" at the 30th International Automobile Festival in Paris, for his contributions to the automotive industry.

In 2017, Yamauchi was awarded an honorary degree in vehicle engineering from University of Modena and Reggio Emilia.

References

External links

Kazunori Yamauchi profile on MobyGames
Kazunori Yamauchi on Twitter

1967 births
People from Kashiwa
Japanese chief executives
Japanese racing drivers
Japanese video game designers
Japanese video game producers
Gran Turismo (series)
Living people
Nürburgring 24 Hours drivers